Ryan Brahms is an American singer-songwriter and multi-instrumentalist, based in New York. His song "Love Dealer" has been successful, charting on the Dance Club Songs chart at 37.

Career
Huff Post described Brahm's music as "[a blend of] elements of R&B and pop into a unique, powerful style of music full of emotion and energy."

In 2017, he released the single "Love Dealer", an R&B-inspired song which was produced by himself and David Wade. A music video was released for the song. It was directed by David Montoya in Cartagena, Colombia.

Discography

Charted singles

References

Living people
Musicians from New York (state)
American male singers
Contemporary R&B singers
Year of birth missing (living people)